Bengt Zikarsky (born 17 July 1967 in Erlangen) is a former freestyle swimmer from Germany, who won the bronze medal in the 4×100 m freestyle relay at the 1996 Summer Olympics in Atlanta, Georgia. He did so alongside Christian Tröger, his twin brother Björn Zikarsky and Mark Pinger. He also won the bronze medal at the same event at the 1992 Summer Olympics in Barcelona, after swimming in the heats.

References

1967 births
Living people
German male swimmers
Olympic swimmers of Germany
Swimmers at the 1992 Summer Olympics
Swimmers at the 1996 Summer Olympics
Olympic bronze medalists for Germany
German twins
Olympic bronze medalists in swimming
German male freestyle swimmers
Twin sportspeople
Recipients of the Silver Laurel Leaf
World Aquatics Championships medalists in swimming
European Aquatics Championships medalists in swimming
Medalists at the 1996 Summer Olympics
Medalists at the 1992 Summer Olympics
Sportspeople from Erlangen
20th-century German people
21st-century German people